INS Kirch is a , currently in active service with the Indian Navy.

Service history

References

Kora-class corvettes
Corvettes of the Indian Navy
Naval ships of India
1995 ships
Ships built in India